Los Cabos United is a Mexican professional football team based in Los Cabos, Baja California Sur that will play in the Liga Premier de México starting in the 2022–23 season.

History
The team was officially presented on January 25, 2022, and it was announced that it would become part of the Liga Premier de México since 2022–23 season, along with Rodrigo Ruiz being announced as the first manager of the club. In February 2022 the team was integrated in the Serie A de México.

Stadium
Los Cabos United will play their home games at the Complejo Deportivo Don Koll in Cabo San Lucas, which has a capacity of 3,500 spectators.

Players

First-team squad

References

Cabo San Lucas
Football clubs in Baja California Sur
Association football clubs established in 2022
2022 establishments in Mexico